Gering is a city in and the county seat of Scotts Bluff County, in the Panhandle region of Nebraska, United States. The population was 8,564 at the 2020 census.

History
Gering was officially founded on March 7, 1887, being located at the base of the bluff that is now the center of Scotts Bluff National Monument. Although settled in 1886, Gering officially became a town in 1887 by a corporation headed by Oscar Gardner of Broken Bow, Nebraska and named for Martin Gering, a pioneer merchant with whom Gardner started the first dry goods store. Gardner, who was also a lawyer and Gering's first notary public, started the post office 1887, becoming Gering's first Postmaster. Union Pacific Railroad platted the town in 1887, but did not lay any track until 1910. In November 1888, Scottsbluff county split from Cheyenne County, and Gering became the new county seat. The city of Scottsbluff was founded across the North Platte River from the bluff in 1899, by a subsidiary of the Burlington Railroad, and had track and a makeshift depot by 1900. Separated only by the river, the two cities have since grown together and now form the 7th largest urban area in Nebraska.

Gering has been served since its founding by the Gering Courier newspaper.

Geography
Gering is located at  (41.824251, -103.665009).

Demographics

Gering is part of the Scottsbluff, Nebraska Micropolitan Statistical Area.

2010 census
At the 2010 census there were 8,500 people, 3,361 households, and 2,278 families living in the city. The racial makeup of the city was 89.6% White, 0.6% African American, 1.5% Native American, 0.4% Asian, 0.1% Pacific Islander, 5.5% from other races, and 2.4% from two or more races. Hispanic or Latino of any race were 17.2%.

Of the 3,361 households 32.8% had children under the age of 18 living with them, 52.8% were married couples living together, 11.5% had a female householder with no husband present, 3.5% had a male householder with no wife present, and 32.2% were non-families. 28.1% of households were one person and 14.7% were one person aged 65 or older. The average household size was 2.45 and the average family size was 2.99.

The median age was 38.7 years. 25.6% of residents were under the age of 18; 7.4% were between the ages of 18 and 24; 23.5% were from 25 to 44; 26.3% were from 45 to 64; and 17.1% were 65 or older. The gender makeup of the city was 46.9% male and 53.1% female.

2000 census
At the 2000 census, there were 7,751 people, 3,173 households, and 2,170 families living in the city. The population density was 2,067.8 people per square mile (798.0/km). There were 3,332 housing units at an average density of 888.9 per square mile (343.1/km). The racial makeup of the city was 91.48% White, 0.13% African American, 1.14% Native American, 0.25% Asian, 0.04% Pacific Islander, 5.56% from other races, and 1.41% from two or more races. Hispanic or Latino of any race were 13.40% of the population.

Of the 3,173 households 31.4% had children under the age of 18 living with them, 55.3% were married couples living together, 10.4% had a female householder with no husband present, and 31.6% were non-families. 28.5% of households were one person and 14.9% were one person aged 65 or older. The average household size was 2.39 and the average family size was 2.93.

The age distribution was 24.6% under the age of 18, 8.1% from 18 to 24, 25.0% from 25 to 44, 23.8% from 45 to 64, and 18.6% 65 or older. The median age was 40 years. For every 100 females, there were 87.9 males. For every 100 females age 18 and over, there were 85.1 males.

The median household income was $35,185, and the median family income was $42,378. Males had a median income of $32,750 versus $22,026 for females. The per capita income for the city was $18,775. About 5.9% of families and 7.8% of the population were below the poverty line, including 8.3% of those under age 18 and 7.4% of those age 65 or over.

Major events
In 1922, Gering started its annual Oregon Trail Days, a celebration that takes place during the second week of July each year. Friends, families, Gering High School classmates, and the Old Settlers reunion all congregate in Gering for a weekend full of activities.

The Oregon Trail Days weekend kicks off with the community barbecue on Thursday night.  Friday morning is the Annual Kiddie Parade on 10th Street, with the International Food Fair in Downtown Gering Friday night.  Saturday morning the community gathers for the annual Oregon Trail Days Parade. This is followed by the annual Chili-Cookoff in Oregon Trail Park, and a concert at Five Rocks Amphitheater on Saturday evening.

Transportation
Gering has been served by public transit since January 10, 2018, with two bus routes provided by Tri-City Roadrunner.

Notable people
 Galen B. Jackman - U.S. Army Major General (retired), Nancy Reagan's escort throughout the state funeral proceedings of former U.S. President Ronald Reagan, first commanding general of Joint Force Headquarters National Capital Region.
 Dave Raymond - Major League Baseball broadcaster with the Texas Rangers.
 James G. Roudebush - U.S. Air Force Lieutenant General, former Surgeon General of the United States Air Force.
 Teresa Scanlan - Miss Nebraska 2010, Miss America 2011.
 Adrian Smith - U.S. House of Representatives, Nebraska 3rd District.
 Asa Wood - Former state senator, president of the Nebraska Press Association, long-time publisher of the Gering Courier, and stockholder of the Scottsbluff Star-Herald
 Kip Gross - Former Major League Baseball pitcher.

Points of interest

 Scotts Bluff National Monument - 3 mi. W
 Northfield Park Arboretum
 Wildcat Hills State Recreation Area - 10 mi. S
 Legacy of the Plains Museum
 Scottsbluff, Nebraska - 3 mi. N
 Oregon Trail Park
 Union Pacific Railroad 2-8-0 Steam Locomotive No. 423
 Five Rocks Amphitheater
 Cedar Canyon
 Carter Canyon

International sister cities
Bamyan, Afghanistan

References

External links
 City of Gering

Cities in Nebraska
Cities in Scotts Bluff County, Nebraska
County seats in Nebraska
Scottsbluff Micropolitan Statistical Area
Populated places established in 1887
1887 establishments in Nebraska